Jung Jae-wook (Hangul: 정재욱; born 24 March 1994) is a South Korean badminton player. Jung who was educated at the Munsu high school, was part of the South Korean junior team that won the silver medal in 2011 and the bronze medal in 2012 at the World Junior Championships. At the 2012 Asian Junior Championships, he also helped the team claim the bronze medal. Partnered with Kim Gi-jung for the Samsung Electro-Mechanics, they won the Summer National Championships in 2017 and 2018. In the international event, they were the finalist at the 2017 Korea Masters in the men's doubles event. He studied at the Korea National Sport University.

Achievements

BWF Grand Prix 
The BWF Grand Prix has two levels: Grand Prix and Grand Prix Gold. It is a series of badminton tournaments, sanctioned by Badminton World Federation (BWF) since 2007.

Men's doubles

  BWF Grand Prix Gold tournament
  BWF Grand Prix tournament

References

External links 
 

1994 births
Living people
South Korean male badminton players